Paul Dodd, was Mayor of Galway,  from 1656 to 1657.

Dodd was sworn into office in September 1656, having been a sheriff under the previous mayor, Humphrey Hurd. He seized a house belonging to John Bodkin, possibly the same man who was Mayor 1639-40, and leased other property he had confiscated from the townspeople. According to William Henry, the new rulers of Galway were crude, lower-class English, who "After burning the costly timberwork in one house, they simply moved into the next house leaving them with a poisoning stench of excrement and filth, that it was almost impossible to enter." His descendants still live in the town.

References
"History of Galway", James Hardiman, 1820
"Old Galway", Maureen Donovan O'Sullivan, 1942
The Tribes of Galway", Adrian J. Martyn, 2001
 Henry, William (2002). Role of Honour: The Mayors of Galway City 1485-2001. Galway: Galway City Council.  

Politicians from County Galway
Mayors of Galway
17th-century Irish businesspeople